Erwin Neher (born 20 March 1944) is a German biophysicist, specializing in the field of cell physiology. For significant contribution in the field, in 1991 he was awarded, along with Bert Sakmann, the Nobel Prize in Physiology or Medicine for "their discoveries concerning the function of single ion channels in cells".

Early life and education
Neher was born in Landsberg am Lech, Upper Bavaria, the son of Elisabeth (née Pfeiffer), a teacher, and Franz Xaver Neher, an executive at a dairy company. He studied physics at the Technical University of Munich from 1963 to 1966.

In 1966, he was awarded a Fulbright Scholarship to study in the US. He spent a year at the University of Wisconsin–Madison, and earned a master's degree in biophysics. While at the Charles Stevens Laboratory at Yale University for post-doctoral work he met fellow scientist Eva-Maria Neher, whom he married in 1978 and subsequently the couple had five children – Richard, Benjamin, Carola, Sigmund, and Margret.

In 2003 Neher was one of 22 Nobel Laureates who signed the Humanist Manifesto.

Career
In 1986, he was awarded the Louisa Gross Horwitz Prize from Columbia University together with Bert Sakmann. In 1987, he received the Gottfried Wilhelm Leibniz Prize of the Deutsche Forschungsgemeinschaft, which is the highest honour awarded in German research.  Along with Bert Sakmann, he was awarded the Nobel Prize in Physiology or Medicine in 1991 for "their discoveries concerning the function of single ion channels in cells".  Neher and Sakmann were the first to record the currents of single ion channels on a live cell (they were first recorded using the lipid bilayer method) through their development of the patch-clamp technique, a project Neher began as a postdoctoral research associate in the laboratory of Charles F. Stevens at Yale.

Since 1983, he became a director at the Max Planck Institute for Biophysical Chemistry in Göttingen and led the Department for Membrane Biophysics. He turned into an emeritus director of the Institute since 2011. He is also a Professor Emeritus at the University of Göttingen and a co-chair of the Bernstein Center for Computational Neuroscience Göttingen .

Honors and awards

 Nobel Prize in Physiology or Medicine (1991, jointly with Bert Sakmann)
 Fellow of the Royal Society (1994)
 Ralph W. Gerard Prize in Neuroscience (1991)
 Gottfried Wilhelm Leibniz Prize (1987)
 Louisa Gross Horwitz Prize (1986)

Neher holds honorary degrees from:
 University of Alicante, Spain, 1993
 University of Wisconsin, Madison, Wisconsin, USA, 1993
 Technical University of Munich, FRG, 1994
 University of Madrid, Spain, 1994
 Huazhong University of Sciences & Technology, Wuhan, PR China, 1994
 University of BahÌa Blanca, Argentine, 1995
 University of Rome, Italy, 1996
 Hebrew University of Jerusalem, Israel, 1999
 University of Pavia, 2000

Neher was elected a Foreign Member of the Royal Society (ForMemRS) in 1994.

References

Further reading

External links

 

1944 births
Living people
German biophysicists
German Nobel laureates
Grand Crosses with Star and Sash of the Order of Merit of the Federal Republic of Germany
Gottfried Wilhelm Leibniz Prize winners
Members of the European Molecular Biology Organization
Foreign associates of the National Academy of Sciences
Foreign Members of the Royal Society
Nobel laureates in Physiology or Medicine
People from Landsberg am Lech
Recipients of the Pour le Mérite (civil class)
Studienstiftung alumni
Technical University of Munich alumni
Academic staff of the University of Göttingen
University of Wisconsin–Madison College of Letters and Science alumni
Max Planck Society people
Members of the European Academy of Sciences and Arts
Electrophysiologists
Members of the Göttingen Academy of Sciences and Humanities
Max Planck Institute directors
Fulbright alumni